The Suárez River, originally Saravita, is a river in the Eastern Ranges of the Colombian Andes. The river originates in Lake Fúquene on the border of Cundinamarca and Boyacá and its mouth is the confluence with the Chicamocha River, forming the Sogamoso River in Santander. It is part of the Magdalena Basin flowing towards the Caribbean Sea.

The river formed the trajectory for the Spanish conquest of the Muisca, when the conquistadors went uphill into the Andes from the tropical lowlands of Barrancabermeja in the north. The frequent floodings of the river have given the Suárez River its name; conquistador Gonzalo Suárez Rendón tried to cross the river in one of his conquest expeditions, but the sudden flooding made his horse drown in the Suárez River.

Etymology 
The Suárez River is named after conquistador Gonzalo Suárez Rendón, after his horse drowned in the river when it experienced sudden flooding. The original name in Chibcha, given by the Guane was Saravita, meaning "departs from here".

Description 
The river starts on the Altiplano Cundiboyacense where it forms the boundary between Cundinamarca and Boyacá and for a major part of its course downstream it is the natural boundary between Boyacá and Santander. The Suárez River is the only outlet of Lake Fúquene.

In Chiquinquirá, it meets the Chiquinquirá River, and in Puente Nacional Quebrada Aguaclara. In Barbosa, the Suárez River meets the Moniquirá River and in Moniquirá the Ubasa River. West of San Gil, the Fonce River flows into the Suárez River and in Villanueva the Chicamocha River and the Suárez River form the Sogamoso River together.

Climate 
Other headwaters are the Lenguazaque River, Ráquira River, Ubaté River, Susa River, Simijaca River and Cucunubá. Nearby Lake Suesca has an endorheic basin, not flowing out to the Suárez River.

Vegetation 
In Saboyá, various flora surrounding the Suárez River have been registered, among others Inga sp., Croton funckianus, Mircyanthes sp., Gynerium saggitattum, tropical smoke bush (Euphorbia cotinifolia), castorbeans (Ricinus communis), Alchornea sp., Colombian oaks (Quercus humboldtii), Eucalyptus globulus and Cupressus sp., Pinus sp. and Acacia sp.

History 

The Suárez River is of importance in the history of Colombia, as it formed the fluvial artery that the conquistadors followed after they left the tropical lowlands of La Tora, present-day Barrancabermeja, uphill towards the Muisca Confederation. The Spanish conquerors followed the course of the Suárez river on the left bank until reaching Lake Fúquene. When Gonzalo Jiménez de Quesada and his greatly reduced troops arrived at the lake, the lake levels were estimated to have been  higher than in 1950.

Tourism 
 Every year in early January, in Barbosa, a festival is held on one of the many river beaches. At this festival Miss Tanga is elected.
 San Gil is a tourist hotspot, famous for its water sports, that happens mostly on the Fonce River, but also on the Suárez River.

Image gallery

See also 

List of rivers of Colombia
Altiplano Cundiboyacense
Chicamocha Canyon

References

Bibliography 
 
 
 
 

Rivers of Colombia
Geography of Cundinamarca Department
Geography of Boyacá Department
Geography of Santander Department
Rivers